Yes I Am Student is a 2021 Indian Punjabi language film directed and produced by Tarnvir Singh Jagpal. It stars Sidhu Moosewala, Mandy Takhar and Gill Raunta. The film is written by Gill Raunta. The film was released on 22 October 2021. This film marked Sidhu Moose Wala's final film in his lifetime before his assassination on 29 May 2022.

Cast 
Sidhu Moosewala as Jass Gill
Mandy Takhar as Reet
Gill Raunta as Heera
Jaggi Singh
Naginder Gakhar as Baldev
Malkit Rauni as Jarnail Singh
Seema Kaushal as Jass Gill 's Mother
Deep Mandian
Raj Kakra as Builder (Cameo appearance)
Harjinder Singh Thind as Radio Jockey
Bhavkhandan Singh Rakhra as Professor

Plot 
A young man leaves his motherland to study abroad and search for a better future in Canada.

Production

Development 
In November 2018 Director Tarnvir Singh Jagpal announced a new film ‘Yes I Am A Student’

Filming 
On 27 August 2019, principal photography began Filming was completed on 4 March 2020 Makers Shared a video on YouTube

Reception 

Neha Vashist of The Times of India gave three out of five stars, stating that "In the movie, there are a number of other characters who played significant roles. For instance, there were students who mirrored the exact image that people with a bias against international students had. They used to burn the money sent by their parents on expensive cars, drugs, clubbing, and more. Thereafter, there was Jassa’s friend, Heera, who made sure to stand by him in every thick and thin, and also made him understand the difference between right and wrong. Last but not least, Jassa’s uncle showed us the image of the so-called relatives who promise to have our back all the time, but never live by their words" Cinestaan.com wrote that, "Yes I Am Student has its heart in the right place and draws attention to an oft-neglected yet crucial issue. It's also nice to see Moosewala's film actively shunning alcohol and drug usage, drawing awareness about the social evil and sending a positive message to viewers."

References

External links
 
 

2021 films
Punjabi-language Indian films
2020s Punjabi-language films